White Men Can't Jump is an upcoming American sports comedy film directed by Charles Kidd II and written by Kenya Barris and Doug Hall. It is a remake of the 1992 film of the same name. It stars Sinqua Walls and Jack Harlow in the lead roles.

White Men Can't Jump is scheduled to be released on May 19, 2023, on Hulu.

Cast 
 Jack Harlow 
 Sinqua Walls as Kamal Allen
 Lance Reddick as Benji Allen, Kamal's father and former coach who suffers from MS
 Teyana Taylor 
 Laura Harrier 
 Tamera Kissen
 Myles Bullock
 Vince Staples
 Zak Steiner
 Andrew Schulz

Production 
In January 2017, Kenya Barris was reported to be developing a White Men Can't Jump remake produced by NBA star Blake Griffin and NFL player Ryan Kalil. Nothing more was mentioned about the project until November 2021, when Calmatic was revealed to be the director. In March 2022, rapper Jack Harlow was cast in the film, in the role originally played by Woody Harrelson. In April 2022, Sinqua Walls was cast as Kamal Allen, the equivalent of Wesley Snipes' character in the original 1992 film. Other characters include Jermaine, who often antagonizes Kamal; Bobby, Kamal's boss; and an opposing fan who trash-talks Kamal. Barris will produce the film under his Khalabo Ink Society banner, and Kalil, Griffin, and Noah Weinstein will produce under their Mortal Media banner. On May 5, 2022, Lance Reddick, Teyana Taylor, and Laura Harrier were cast in the film. Additional castings included Tamera "Tee" Kissen, Myles Bullock, Vince Staples, and Zak Steiner.

Filming began on May 11, 2022, in Los Angeles, with Tommy Maddox-Upshaw as the cinematographer. It wrapped up by July 2022. The film will feature a soundtrack by DJ Drama. By January 11, 2023, the film was in post-production.

Release
White Men Can't Jump is scheduled to be released on May 19, 2023, on Hulu.

References

External links 
 

Upcoming films
2023 comedy films
2020s American films
2020s buddy comedy films
2020s sports comedy films
20th Century Studios films
African-American comedy films
American basketball films
American buddy comedy films
American sports comedy films
Comedy film remakes
Films directed by Calmatic
Films shot in Los Angeles
Films with screenplays by Kenya Barris
Hulu original films
Remakes of American films
Upcoming English-language films